Shabareesh Varma is an Indian lyricist, singer and actor working in Malayalam and Tamil films. Shabareesh made his debut in the Alphonse Putharen's acclaimed 2013 film Neram where he rose to fame with his lyrics for the song Pistah in Neram, which was also used as the promo song for the 2016 Indian Premier League.

Early life
Shabareesh Varma was born to P.K Nandan Varma and Sulekha Varma in North Paravur, Ernakulam. He studied in SAE Institute, Chennai and graduated in Audio Engineering and Music Production. After completing the graduation course From MES College Marampally, Aluva, he worked in the films Vinnaithaandi Varuvaayaa, Ye Maaya Chesave, Nadunisi Naaygal, Pizza , Soodhu Kavvum, Pizza II: Villa, and Jigarthanda. He started his acting stint with a short film "Cling-Cling" followed by "Neram (short film)" in which he was the protagonist pitched up against Vijay Sethupathi (as Vatti Raja).

Film career

His first film was the Tamil version of Neram  directed by Alphonse Putharen. In 2015, he was a part of the Malayalam movie Premam as a lyricist, singer and actor. He wrote the lyrics for 7 songs, sung 5 of them and played the character 'Shambu' in the film.

Outside film industry
In 2016, he sung the official theme song of the Manjappada, which is the supporters group of Kerala Blasters. In 2020, he wrote one song for Yennum Yellow, which is an album released by Kerala Blasters as a tribute to their fans. He also performed one song called 'Vaa Varika Vaa'  which is written by Manu Manjith and Nikhil Thomas.

Filmography
All films are in Malayalam, unless otherwise noted.

As lyricist

As an Actor

As a Singer

Outside film industry
In 2016, he sung the official theme song of the Manjappada, which is the supporters group of Kerala Blasters. In 2020, he wrote one song for Yennum Yellow, which is an album released by Kerala Blasters as a tribute to their fans. He also performed one song called 'Vaa Varika Vaa'  which is written by Manu Manjith and Nikhil Thomas.

Awards and nominations

Vayalar Samskarika Vedhi Film Award 2016– Best Debut Actor (Male)- Shambhu from Premam

SIIMA

2015 – Best Lyricist for 'Malare' from 'Premam' 

IIFA Utsavam Awards

2015 – Best Lyricist for 'Malare' from 'Premam'

Vanitha Film Awards

2015 – Best Newcomer for the role 'Shambhu' from 'Premam'

Asianet Comedy Awards

2015 – Best Comical Song for 'Scene Contra' from 'Premam'

References

External links
 
 
 http://www.filmibeat.com/celebs/shabareesh-varma
 http://spicyonion.com/singer/shabareesh-varma
 http://www.hungama.com/artists/shabareesh-varma/779454
 http://malayalasangeetham.info/displayProfile.php?category=lyricist&artist=Shabareesh%20Varma

Male actors from Kochi
Indian male film actors
Living people
21st-century Indian male actors
1985 births
Male actors in Malayalam cinema
Male actors in Tamil cinema
Malayalam playback singers
Indian male playback singers
Malayalam-language lyricists
Singers from Kochi
Screenwriters from Kochi